A chicken sandwich is a sandwich that typically consists of boneless, skinless chicken breast or thigh served between slices of bread, on a bun, or on a roll. Variations on the "chicken sandwich" include the chicken burger, chicken on a bun, chickwich, hot chicken, or chicken salad sandwich.

In American English, a sandwich is any two pieces of bread with filling, including rolls, buns, or even chocolate sliders when it comes to ice-cream sandwiches; in British English (and also some other national English varieties, such as those of Canada, Ireland, Australia and New Zealand), the word sandwich is defined more narrowly, to require the pieces of bread to be sliced from a loaf, and a roll or bun with filling would not generally be called a sandwich. A bun with a cooked chicken breast as filling would generally be called a chicken sandwich in the U.S., but in the UK and other Commonwealth or former colonial countries, such a dish is not considered a sandwich, and would generally be called a chicken burger instead; most Americans would not consider such as dish to count as a burger, since Americans generally consider a burger to require a patty made from ground/minced meat.

Composition
In the United States, the sandwich usually consists of a chicken filet or patty, toppings and bread. The chicken meat can be deep fried, grilled, roasted or boiled, served hot or cold, and white or dark meat chicken can be used. Shredded chicken in one form or another, such as chicken salad, can also be used in chicken sandwiches. Another form is made with cold cuts. Wrap versions of the sandwich can also be made, in which the ingredients are rolled up inside a flatbread, such as a tortilla. Open-faced versions of the sandwich, which feature hot chicken served with gravy on top of bread, are also common variations.

Varieties

Chicken burger

Some establishments serving hamburgers also serve chicken sandwiches, giving customers an alternative to beef. Such a sandwich may also be called "chicken on a bun" or "chicken burger" in many countries, and is served on a hamburger bun with similar condiments and toppings as found on hamburgers. While most chicken sandwiches in this context usually use fried or grilled chicken breasts, a chicken burger may also be made of a grilled or fried patty of ground chicken.

History

Chick-fil-A claims that it invented the fried chicken sandwich in the 1940s. This claim is unsubstantiated, although the Chick-fil-A southern-style chicken sandwich (served with pickles on a steamed roll), introduced on March 21, 1964, was most likely the first chicken sandwich introduced by a fast food restaurant chain. Other notable vendors of chicken sandwiches include KFC and Popeyes Louisiana Kitchen. Today, most major fast food, fast casual and casual dining chains feature some sort of chicken sandwich, even at restaurants where chicken is not a specialty.

Chicken salad sandwich
Chicken salad served between slices of bread is a chicken sandwich variation seen both in North America and elsewhere.

Regional varieties

Ireland
In Ireland, the popular chicken fillet roll is a baguette filled with a spicy or plain Southern-fried breaded chicken fillet and a mayonnaise and/or butter spread.

Canada

The hot chicken sandwich or simply "hot chicken" (French: sandwich chaud au poulet) is a chicken sandwich covered with gravy eaten with utensils. The sandwich is sometimes served with green peas It is especially popular in Quebec and is often considered one of the province's staple dishes. Since it is so commonly found in eateries of Quebec (Rôtisserie St-Hubert, Valentine, e.g.) and less seen outside the province, many Québécois regard it as a part of Quebec cuisine and believe it to have originated in the province. This combination of chicken, gravy, and peas is known by its own term: galvaude, seen in poutine galvaude.

The sandwich is also found in small diners in the Canadian Maritimes and throughout the Southeastern United States.

The sandwich was a working-class dish already common and well established in North American cuisine by the early 1900s and featured on the food menus of pharmacists and druggists of the time. Due to its ease of preparation and its minimal costs, the sandwich was also widely served in the mess halls and cafeterias of the mid-1900s.

This style of sandwich often makes use of leftovers from a previous meal. Substituting turkey for the chicken would make a hot turkey sandwich and substituting roast beef makes a variety of the roast beef sandwich.

Latin America

The pepito is a sandwich that is prepared with chicken or beef, beans or refried beans and a roll or bun as primary ingredients. It is a common street food in Mexico and Venezuela.

Midwestern United States
Found in Ohio is the shredded chicken sandwich.  The sandwich is also referred to as a hot chicken sandwich in rural Ohio.  The sandwich consists of shredded chicken, one or more types of condensed soup, seasoning and crushed crackers to help thicken and bind the sauce.  This dish can be heated on a stove top or slow cooker.  Invented as a way to use leftover chicken, these sandwiches became popular for covered dish dinners, potlucks, church dinners and tailgate parties. They are also sold in small-town restaurants, drive-ins and bars. The sandwich can also be found at "Ohio" community dinners on the Gulf Coast of Florida held by retirees or snowbirds from Ohio.

See also

Burger King grilled chicken sandwiches
Chicken Sandwich Wars
List of sandwiches
McChicken

References

Further reading
Fuller, Eva Greene (1909).  The Up-to-date Sandwich Book: 400 Ways to Make a Sandwich. A. C. McClurg & Company. pp. 82–88.

External links

American chicken dishes
American sandwiches
Canadian chicken dishes